91 (ninety-one) is the natural number following 90 and preceding 92.

In mathematics
91 is:

 the twenty-seventh distinct semiprime and the second of the form (7×q).
 a triangular number.
 a hexagonal number, one of the few such numbers to also be a centered hexagonal number.
 a centered nonagonal number.
 a centered cube number.
 a square pyramidal number, being the sum of the squares of the first six integers.
 the smallest positive integer expressible as a sum of two cubes in two different ways if negative roots are allowed (alternatively the sum of two cubes and the difference of two cubes): . (See 1729 for more details). This implies that 91 is the second cabtaxi number.
 the smallest positive integer expressible as a sum of six distinct squares: .
 The only other ways to write 91 as a sum of distinct squares are:  and
 .
 the smallest pseudoprime satisfying the congruence .
 a repdigit in base 9 (1119).
 palindromic in bases 3 (101013), 9 (1119), and 12 (7712).
 the fourth composite number in the 11-aliquot tree. The aliquot sum of 91 is 21 within the aliquot sequence (91,21,11,1,0).
 a Riordan number.

The decimal equivalent of the fraction  can be obtained by using powers of 9.

In science
 91 is the atomic number of protactinium, an actinide.
 McCarthy 91 function, a recursive function in discrete mathematics
 Messier object M91, a magnitude 11.5 spiral galaxy in the constellation Coma Berenices
 The New General Catalogue object NGC 91, a single star in the constellation Andromeda

In other fields

Ninety-one is also:

 The code for international direct dial phone calls to India
 In cents of a U.S. dollar, the amount of money one has if one has one each of the coins of denominations less than a dollar (penny, nickel, dime, quarter and half dollar)
 The ISBN Group Identifier for books published in Sweden.
 Psalm 91 is known as the Psalm of Protection.
 91 is a solitaire card game where the object is to move cards, so the top cards total 91.
 STS-91 Space Shuttle Discovery mission to the International Space Station, June 2, 1998
 Swedish comic strip 91:an
 The 91st Missile Wing (91 SW) is a Minuteman (missile) III unit of the United States Air Force, based at Minot Air Force Base, North Dakota
 The number of the French department Essonne

References

Integers